Windy City Pro Wrestling is an American regional professional wrestling promotion originally based in Chicago, Illinois. Established as Windy City Wrestling by retired wrestler Sam DeCero in 1988, the promotion was one of several major regional territories in the Midwest, along with Dick the Bruiser's World Wrestling Association, during the late 1980s and among the oldest independent organizations in the United States until its last promoted show in December 2010.

In November 2015, the expired WCPW trademark was re-registered by former Windy City Pro Wrestling wrestler James K. Duck.

History

1980s
After retiring from professional wrestling due to a back injury, Sam DeCero purchased a 95th street garage on Chicago's South Side and began training local wrestlers, advertising as far as Hammond, Indiana. With Mike Gratchner, a former promoter and wrestling photographer, DeCero decided to establish his own promotion. Within a year, he had managed to secure investors including relatives, friends and co-workers and held the promotions first event at a South Side nightspot featuring Steve Regal against Paul Christy in the main event on January 30, 1988. The event, which was attended by 160 people, was successful, and soon the promotion began holding events in similar venues offering to hold cards ranging from $3,500 to $9,500.

DeCero soon began running televised wrestling events with then-22-year-old Paul Heyman, who was also working for Southeastern promotions Southern Championship Wrestling and the Continental Wrestling Federation. Their events were held at DaVinci Manor nightclub (originally Balaban and Katz's Manor Theater) and the International Amphitheater, which later aired on WMBD-TV. During the summer, saw serious losses due to poor attendance, including losing $10,000 at a show in Rockford, Illinois and between $12,000–13,000 at the International Amphitheater. In September, despite drawing a large crowd at a card featuring Terry "Bam Bam" Gordy and Bam Bam Bigalow in the main event, the promotion still lost money.

Within four years, the promotion operated two training facilities and had a weekly half-hour television show airing on SportsChannel. They also participated in several fundraisers for charity organizations including Toys for Tots, Muscular Dystrophy, Maryville City for Youth and the Chicago Coalition for the Homeless.

During the late 1980s, the promotion featured many popular wrestlers of the era including Dick Murdoch, Shigeri Akabane, Dennis Condrey, Steve Regal, and George Ringo, who acted as honorary commissioner. Prior to his death in Puerto Rico, Bruiser Brody had been scheduled to face Nord the Barbarian at the International Amphitheater in Chicago, Illinois on August 12, 1988. Other mainstays included "Mean" Mike Anthony, Trevor Blanchard, Rockin' Randy, Tony Montana, and The Power Twins (Larry & David Sontag).

1990s
The annual Battle of the Belts supercard was aired on SportsChannel on May 22, 1993, and two years later, it presented Sailor Art Thomas a "Lifetime Service to Sport Award" on May 16, 1995. The promotion also began holding events in venues outside the Chicago-area such the Hammond Civic Center in Hammond, Indiana and Hempstead High School in Dubuque, Iowa in February 1996. In September, the promotion initiated in a nine-month legal dispute with Ted Turner's World Championship Wrestling regarding trademark infringement over the use of the WCW acronym. The matter was settled out of court and in late 1997, the promotion was renamed Windy City Pro Wrestling (WCPW).

In August 1999, the promotion began broadcasting live events via the internet through the website LiveOnTheNet.com as part of its Sunday afternoon sports lineup featuring Mike Anthony, "Tenacious" Terry Allen, Ripper Manson, Stone Manson, Steve Boz, Willie "Da Bomb" Richardson, Sgt. Storm, The Outfit, Lips Manson and Greg "The Hammer" Valentine.

2000s
The promotion managed to survive during the decade, and due in part to its wrestling school and televised events in the Chicago-area, several light heavyweight wrestlers such as Ace Steel, Sosay, Kevin Quinn, Christopher Daniels, "Tenacious" Terry Allen, Steve Boz, Brandon Bishop, Vic Capri, and Jayson Reign emerged from the promotion during the late 1990s and early 2000s. During the last several years, independent wrestlers such as Colt Cabana, Abyss and Austin Aries among others have made appearances in the promotion as have WWF veterans King Kong Bundy, Greg "The Hammer" Valentine, and Jerry "The King" Lawler.

On May 20, 2000, WCPW promoted the Largest Battle Royal in History at that time.  Battle of the Belts 2000, an event held in The Hammond Civic Center in front of 2500 fans, was an event main evented by a 3 ring, 120 person Battle Royal to crown the first-ever WCPW Battle Royal Champion.  Bigtime won the Championship that night in what is still the largest championship match in all of pro wrestling history.

The promotion remained popular with Chicago wrestling fans favoring its "old school" wrestling approach unlike "sports entertainment" based promotions such as the World Wrestling Federation, and it began competing with rival promotions such as All American Wrestling, Independent Wrestling Association Midsouth and AWA Slam. Working with its affiliate organization Urban American Professional Wrestling in Chicago's inner-city areas in recent years, its South Side wrestling school was featured on Insomniac with Dave Attell in 2002.

In 2001, DeCero hired wrestler James "Bigtime" Duck to create the main event of Battle of the Belts 2001.  Duck presented the Stacked Ring Battle Royale, a match dubbed "The Badder, Ladder, Royale".  The match was held in front of 1900 fans and featured two rings side by side arranged like a staircase.  The first ring was a standard wrestling ring.  The second ring stood twice as tall as the first and had a ladder in it.  The rules had 40 participants start in the lower ring and try to climb into the taller ring to attempt to set up the ladder to climb it and claim the Battle Royal Championship Belt suspended 50 feet in the air.

In 2004, with over 1,000 in attendance at Morton College in Cicero for their supercard Battle of the Belts 16 grossing over $15,000, the following year Battle of the Belts 17 was held at the Hammond Civic Center on May 17, 2005; shortly before signing with World Wrestling Entertainment, Rob Van Dam had previously headlined a WCPW event against League Champion "Tenacious" Terry Allen at the building on May 26, 2001 attended by 2,000 fans. Reduced revenue as a result of losing talent to major promotions led to the closure of WCPW's South Side Production Studio. WCPW attempted to revive business by hiring Hulk Hogan to appear at an autograph signing in 2009 and promoting a supershow at Toyota Park in Bridgeview, Illinois in conjunction.  While the event was a moderate success, it was not enough to turn the company around and in December 2010, WCPW ran its last event with DeCero as owner.

Wrestlers
DeCero hired a number of national starts to appear during the time his promotion was operating, including:

 Bam Bam Bigelow
 Colonel DeBeers
 Dennis Condrey
 Dick Murdoch
 Shigeri Akabane
 Mr. Electricity Steve Regal
 Terry Gordy

He also operated a well-regarded wrestling school and helped train and/or promote new wrestlers, such as

 Big Time
 Christopher Daniels
 Frank "The Tank" Melson
 Jonnie Stewart
 Kevin Quinn
 "Big Nasty" Ed Ross

Championships

Retired, defunct, and inactive championships

Lee Sanders Memorial Tournament winners
Between 2001 and 2010, Windy City Pro Wrestling hosted an open-invitational tournament, the "Lee Sanders Memorial Cup", as part of an annual tribute to longtime WCPW mainstay Lee Sanders, who wrestled as Staff Sgt. Storm, in which any independent wrestler throughout the U.S. was eligible to enter.

References

External links
 
 Windy City Pro Wrestling Archive

Independent professional wrestling promotions based in the Midwestern United States
Entertainment companies established in 1988
1988 establishments in Illinois